

Elimination round

Postseason
No Final Four because De La Salle University swept the Elimination Round with a 14-0 win-loss card

UAA
UAA
UAAP Season 67
UAAP volleyball tournaments